Kamarul Afiq Bin Kamaruddin (born 7 May 1986) is a Malaysian footballer who plays as a centre-back for Johor Bahru FA in Malaysia M3 League. Kamarul Afiq began his career professionally for Johor FA and spent eight years in Selangor where he played for several fellow Super league and Premier league clubs there.

Club career

Johor FA 
Kamarul Afiq started his football career for Johor FA at 18 years of age. He played for the team for one year before moving to another club, PKNS FC.

PKNS FC 
Kamarul Afiq spent few years at PKNS FC before joined another now-defunct Super League club, Plus FC.

Plus FC 
Kamarul Afiq joined Plus FC. He spent another several years before signed for another league club, FELDA United FC.

FELDA United FC 
Kamarul joined Felda United FC after Plus FC has been dissolved in 2010.

Sime Darby FC 
Kamarul Afiq joined newly promoted side, Sime Darby FC, after years with FELDA United. He spent another two years for the club and helped the team to clinched fifth in its maiden season in the 2011 season. He was also in the winning squad that beat the Super League side, Pahang FA, 6-0 on aggregate to qualify for their first ever Malaysia Cup tournament. For the 2012 Malaysia Premier League, he helped Sime Darby FC finish third behind champions ATM FA and second placed Pahang.

Johor Darul Takzim FC 
Kamarul Afiq joined big spending club, Johor Darul Takzim FC for the 2013 league season and took the captaincy role for the season.

Style of play 
Primarily as a center back, he has formed rock-solid defending deep on the back, along with Aidil Zafuan. He is good at reading games and interceptions of through ball. Kamarul has cited Real Madrid's Sergio Ramos as his inspiration in football.

Personal life 
Kamarul's father, Kamaruddin Ahmad, formerly played for and captained the Johor squad.

Honour

References

External links 
 

1986 births
Living people
Malaysian footballers
People from Johor
Association football defenders
Johor Darul Ta'zim F.C. players
PDRM FA players